The women's heptathlon at the 2022 World Athletics U20 Championships was held at the Estadio Olímpico Pascual Guerrero on 3 and 4 August.

27 athletes from 18 countries were entered to the competition.

Records
U20 standing records prior to the 2022 World Athletics U20 Championships were as follows:

Results

References

heptathlon
Combined events at the World Athletics U20 Championships